Sara Lundgaard (born 26 June 1997) is a Danish badminton player. Lundagaard started her junior career at the Lillerød club, and she moved to Værløse.
In 2015, she won the silver medal at the European Junior Championships in the mixed doubles event.

Personal life 
Lundgarg is a daughter of the former Danish national badminton player, and two times All England Open champion, Martin Lundgaard Hansen. She educated at the Hillerød Business School, and in 2016, she received a scholarship to study Chinese language in Taiwan.

Achievements

European Junior Championships 
Mixed doubles

BWF International Challenge/Series 
Women's doubles

Mixed doubles

  BWF International Challenge tournament
  BWF International Series tournament
  BWF Future Series tournament

References

External links 
 

1997 births
Living people
People from Hillerød Municipality
Danish female badminton players
Sportspeople from the Capital Region of Denmark
21st-century Danish women